The 1972 Baltimore Colts season was the 20th season for the team in the National Football League. They finished with 5 wins and 9 losses, third in the AFC East.

Robert Irsay, who had recently taken over the Los Angeles Rams, traded ownership of the NFL franchises with Colts' owner Carroll Rosenbloom, with players and coaching staffs remaining intact. However, the Colts were getting older and started 1–4 before third-year head coach Don McCafferty was fired by new general manager Joe Thomas. In their final nine games under interim head coach John Sandusky, Baltimore won four to finish at 5–9, their first losing mark in sixteen years. The entire coaching staff was let go after the season concluded.

Offseason
July 13 – Robert Irsay bought the Los Angeles Rams and transferred ownership to Carroll Rosenbloom, in exchange for ownership of the Baltimore Colts.

NFL draft

Personnel

Staff/coaches

Roster

Regular season 

The season began ominously for the Colts when they were defeated at home on opening day by the St. Louis Cardinals and their journeyman quarterback, Tim Van Galder. In week two, Johnny Unitas threw for 376 yards and three touchdowns, but it was far from enough as Joe Namath threw for 496 yards and six touchdowns to power the New York Jets to a 44–34 victory at Memorial Stadium, the Jets' first victory over the Colts since Super Bowl III.

In October, the Colts' season reached its nadir when it was shut out twice at home in a three-week stretch by the Dallas Cowboys, who undoubtedly wanted revenge for their loss to Baltimore in Super Bowl V, and the Miami Dolphins, who were on their way to a 17–0 season and their first Super Bowl championship under former Colts coach Don Shula.

Unitas, age 39, made his final appearance in Baltimore in the fourth quarter of a 35–7 victory over Buffalo on December 3, and threw a 63-yard completion for his 287th career touchdown pass. Two weeks later, he played his final game as a Colt, with a completion and an interception.

For the third consecutive year, the Colts played their season finale at the Orange Bowl in Miami. Only this time, it was not in the postseason, but a humbling 16–0 shutout to the Dolphins in Week 14 in a game which was nowhere near as close as the final score. Baltimore ended the 1970 season with a win over the Cowboys in Super Bowl V, and ended the 1971 season with a loss to the Dolphins in the AFC Championship Game.

Schedule

Standings

See also 
History of the Indianapolis Colts
Indianapolis Colts seasons
Colts–Patriots rivalry

References

Baltimore Colts
1972
Baltimore Colts